SS Monroe may refer to one of the following

, an Old Dominion Line steamship sunk in 1914 collision.
, a Design 1025 type ship built at Newburgh Shipyards Inc., Newburgh, New York and scrapped 1954.

Ship names